Patrick J. Lynch is a New York City Police Department officer, and the president of its union, the Police Benevolent Association of the City of New York.

Personal Life
Lynch was born in Bayside, Queens to an Irish Catholic family. He is the youngest of seven children. His father was a subway motorman for 30 years. He went to Monsignor Scanlan High School in the Bronx.

Lynch is married to Kathleen Casey, and has two sons, Patrick and Kevin, both of whom are New York City police officers.

Career
Lynch worked for a short time as a New York City Subway conductor, but on January 4, 1984, he became a police officer with the New York City Police Department. He has been described as "New York City's Blue Bulldog" for being head of one of the largest police unions in the world, having served in this role since 1999 and winning reelection to a fifth term in 2015. 

As of 2023, Lynch makes $109,000 per year as a police officer. If he was promoted to detective or sergeant, he would have to resign from his union position. He is assigned to the 90th Precinct, which covers the Williamsburg neighborhoods of Brooklyn. He additionally pulls in a matching salary as the head of the union, doubling his annual income. Lynch was the subject of one Civilian Complaint Review Board complaint in July 1987 for inappropriate use of force; the Board later declared the complaint "unsubstantiated" due to their being unable to contact the plaintiff.

Controversies
Lynch has a history of conflicting with New York City Hall. In 2007, he stated that the PBA "could never support former New York City Mayor Rudy Giuliani for any elected office." He has also criticized Police Commissioner Ray Kelly, former Mayors Michael Bloomberg and Bill de Blasio, other city trade union leaders, the New York City Council, the Civilian Complaint Review Board, and several national political leaders.

Lynch spoke against the city's teachers' union boss Michael Mulgrew for co-sponsoring Al Sharpton's rally against stop-and-frisk, saying "It is absolutely ridiculous that [Mulgrew] . . . would waste his members' dues to get involved with a march that has nothing to do with teachers or his union." 

In the wake of 2014 killings of NYPD officers, Lynch turned his back on Mayor Bill de Blasio due to the belief the that political climates set by the mayor and other government officials led to the killing of the two officers. After the autopsy of Eric Garner, who died as a result of a chokehold in July 2014 while being suspected of selling loose cigarettes, he defended the actions of the NYPD officers. 

In November 2019, both Lynch and de Blasio criticized Bloomberg's apology for the stop-and-frisk policy which occurred under his administration. Lynch released a statement that said, in part, “The apology is too little, too late”; "Mayor Bloomberg could have saved himself this apology if he had just listened to the police officers on the street”; “We said in the early 2000s that the quota-driven emphasis on street stops was polluting the relationship between cops and our communities”; and “His administration’s misguided policy inspired an anti-police movement that has made cops the target of hatred and violence, and stripped away many of the tools we had used to keep New Yorkers safe.”

On August 18, 2020, Lynch and the PBA endorsed Donald Trump for President in the 2020 United States presidential election and appeared in the 2020 Republican National Convention.

References

External links

Leaders of organizations
American trade union leaders
Police unions in the United States
People from Bayside, Queens
New York City Police Department officers
American people of Irish descent
1964 births
Living people